was the pseudonym of a Japanese painter from the Meiji period. One of Okakura Tenshin's pupils along with Yokoyama Taikan and Shimomura Kanzan, he played a role in the Meiji era innovation of Nihonga. His real name was Hishida Miyoji. He was also known for his numerous paintings of cats.

Biography 
Shunsō was born in 1874 in what is now part of Iida city in Nagano Prefecture. In 1889 he moved to Tokyo to study under Kanō school artist Yuki Masaaki (1834–1904). The following year, he enrolled at the Tōkyō Bijutsu Gakkō (the forerunner of the Tokyo National University of Fine Arts and Music). Shunsō was one year junior to his colleagues Yokoyama Taikan and Shimomura Kanzan; his teacher was Hashimoto Gahō. Shunsō, Taikan and Kanzan were heavily influenced by Okakura Tenshin and Ernest Fenollosa during their time at the Tōkyō Bijutsu Gakkō.

After graduation, Shunsō was commissioned by the Imperial Household Museum (now the Tokyo National Museum) to copy important religious paintings at Buddhist temples in Kyoto and Nara, and he also became a teacher at the Tōkyō Bijutsu Gakkō (present-day Tokyo University of the Arts)). In 1898, he joined Okakura Tenshin in establishing the Nihon Bijutsuin. From 1903–1905, he traveled extensively overseas, holding exhibitions of his works in India, the United States and in Europe.

After his return to Japan, Shunsō successfully competed in many national exhibitions in Japan, including the government-sponsored Bunten.

Shunsō developed a new painting method, derogatorily named by his contemporaries as moro-tai (vague style). This new method used a gradation of colors to replace the line drawings that characterized traditional Japanese-style painting. This new style, however, gained little support from Shunsō's contemporaries and was severely criticized by art critics. Shunsō came to realize that while moro-tai was effective in depicting such scenes as morning mist and evening glow, its color gradation technique proved good only for those limited motifs. Shunsō began integrating his original moro-tai with line drawing to overcome this disadvantage, and his later works exhibit a new style which came to typify the Nihonga genre, distinguishing it from the more restrictive styles of traditional Japanese-style painting.

In his final years, Shunsō suffered from renal, or kidney disease. Driven by fear of blindness, Shunsō painted frantically whenever his illness entered a state of remission. In 1909, his work Ochiba won the highest award at the third Bunten Exhibition. It is now designated an Important Cultural Property by the Japanese government's Agency for Cultural Affairs and is now in the collection of the Eisei Bunko Museum, Tokyo. His representative work "Ochiba" is based on the motif of a thicket of trees around Yoyogi, Tokyo, Japan, which was still a suburb at the time. His work Black Cat (1910) has also been designated an Important Cultural Property. In 1911, he died of kidney disease (nephritis) just before his 37th birthday.

A large retrospective exhibition of his work was held at the National Museum of Modern Art, Tokyo’s Art Museum Special Gallery in 2014.

Philately 
One of Hishida Shunsō's works has been selected as the subject of a commemorative postage stamps by the Japanese government:

 1979: Black Cat, as part of the Modern Art Series

In the year 1951, Hishida Shunsō himself was the subject of a commemorative postage stamp under the Cultural Leaders Series by Japan Post.

Famous works 
寡婦と孤児 (1895, Tokyo University of the Arts)
水鏡 (1897, Tokyo University of the Arts)
六歌仙（1899, property of Eisei Bunko, entrusted to Kumamoto Prefectural Art Museum）
秋景（渓山紅葉）（1899, Shimane Art Museum）
菊慈童 (1900, Iida Municipal Exhibition Hall)
雪後の月 (1902, Museum of Modern Art, Shiga)
王昭君 (1902, Yamagata 善寶寺, Important Cultural Property)
猫梅（1906, Adachi Museum of Art）
賢首菩薩 (1907, National Museum of Modern Art, Tokyo, Important Cultural Property)
落葉 (1909, property of Eisei Bunko, entrusted to Kumamoto Prefectural Art Museum, Important Cultural Property)
黒き猫 (1910, property of Eisei Bunko, entrusted to Kumamoto Prefectural Art Museum, Important Cultural Property)

References 

Briessen, Fritz van. The Way of the Brush: Painting Techniques of China and Japan. Tuttle (1999). 
Conant, Ellen P., Rimer, J. Thomas, Owyoung, Stephen. Nihonga: Transcending the Past: Japanese-Style Painting, 1868-1968. Weatherhill (1996). 
  “Decoration” and “Realism” seen in Hishida Shunso’s "Rokkasen"
 A Essay on Hishida Shunso's "Kikujido" -constancy and impermanence-
 Tonal Painting and Mōrōtai J. McN. Whistler, Yokoyama Taikan and Hishida Shunso

External links 

Art site with samples of his works
bio site in Japanese with photos and samples of his works
Iida Museum site with samples of his works
Hishida Shunsō biography and artworks at Trivium Art History
 Hishida Shunso's Works and Museum Collection
 Hishida Shunso - Eisei Bunko Museum
 A great man born in the hometown Hishida Shunso - Iida City Homepage

1874 births
1911 deaths
Cat artists
Deaths from kidney failure
Nihonga painters
Buddhist artists
People from Iida, Nagano
People of Meiji-period Japan
Tokyo School of Fine Arts alumni
20th-century Japanese painters